Ippolito Sanfratello (born 11 March 1973) is an ice speed skater from Italy, who won the gold medal in the Team Pursuit at the 2006 Winter Olympics. He placed 18th in the 1500m, 14th in the 5000m and 12th in the 10000m.

Records

References

External links
 Photos of Ippolito Sanfratello
 

1973 births
Living people
Italian male speed skaters
Speed skaters at the 2006 Winter Olympics
Olympic gold medalists for Italy
Olympic medalists in speed skating
Medalists at the 2006 Winter Olympics
20th-century Italian people
21st-century Italian people